Amauris ochlea, the novice, is a butterfly of the family Nymphalidae. It is found in southern and south-east Africa.

The wingspan is 55–60 mm for males and 60–65 mm for females. Adults are on wing year round (with peaks in summer and autumn).

The larvae feed on Tylophora anomala, Tylophora stolzii, Gymnema, Marsdenia, Secamone, Cynanchum chirindense, Cyanchum abyssinicum, Cynanchum medium, Cynanchum nigrum, Cynanchum natalitium and Cynanchum vincetoxicum.

Subspecies
Amauris ochlea ochlea (eastern Kenya to Zululand, Natal)
Amauris ochlea affinis Aurivillius, 1911 (Comoro Islands)
Amauris ochlea bumilleri Lanz, 1896 (northern Malawi, south-western Tanzania, Zambia)
Amauris ochlea darius Rothschild & Jordan, 1903 (northern Kenya (Meru, Mount Kulai) to southern Somalia and southern Ethiopia)
Amauris ochlea moya Turlin, 1994 (Comoro Islands)
Amauris ochlea ochleides Staudinger, 1896 (Eritrea, northern Ethiopia)

Gallery 
Specimens from the coastal forest at Mabibi, KwaZulu Natal, South Africa.

References

Seitz, A. Die Gross-Schmetterlinge der Erde 13: Die Afrikanischen Tagfalter. Plate XIII 24 a nominate b bumilleri

Amauris
Butterflies described in 1847